Goldman Sachs Personal Financial Management, is a division of Goldman Sachs responsible for wealth management of high-net-worth individuals. It has 74 offices in the United States and manages $25 billion in assets.

History 
Goldman Sachs Personal Financial Management was founded in 2005, under the name United Capital, as a national network of independent advisory firms. The company was initially founded, financed and developed by Joe Duran and his business colleagues. By 2010, United Capital had over 150 employees and $30 million in revenue. By 2008, following several acquisitions of investment advisory firms such as Maul Capital Management, Integrated Financial Management, and Trevethan Capital Partners, United Capital was operating with 47 offices and 350 employees. The company made its largest acquisition in 2012 when it acquired Zirkin, a $1.6 billion firm that was previously part of M&T Bank.

United Capital was acquired by Goldman Sachs on May 16, 2019, for $750 million and the name of the division was subsequently rebranded as Goldman Sachs Personal Financial Management on January 30, 2020.

References

Financial services companies established in 2005
2005 establishments in California
Companies based in Newport Beach, California
Financial services companies based in California
Investment management companies of the United States
Goldman Sachs
2019 mergers and acquisitions